Aleksandr Pavlovich Antonov (13 February 1898, in Moscow – 26 November 1962) was a Soviet film actor who had a lengthy career, stretching from the silent era to the 1950s. Antonov was named Merited Artist of the Russian Federation in 1950.

Antonov was a member of the Moscow Proletarian Culture Theater between the years 1920–1924 when he met Sergei Eisenshtein, who cast him in his directorial debut short film Glumov's Diary (1923) and in his first full-length feature Strike (1924). Eisenshtein then gave Antonov the part of Bolshevik leader Grigory Vakulinchuk in The Battleship Potemkin (1925), which remains his best known role.

Antonov continued his career into both the late silent and the sound period where he usually played episodic character actor roles of either proletarians or sailors. He worked with leading directors, including Ivan Pyryev on A Rich Bride (1938), Vsevolod Pudovkin on Suvorov (1941), Mikhail Romm on Secret Mission (1950), and Yuli Raizman on Dream of a Cossack'' (1950).

FilmographyGlumov's Diary (1923) as JoffreStrike (1925) as member of strike committeeBattleship Potemkin (1925) as Grigory Vakulinchuk (Bolshevik sailor)The Wind (1926) as sailorA Girl with a Temper (1939) as Mehkov, director of the animal-breeding sovkhozSuvorov (1941) as Colonel Tyurin, commander of the Azov regimentThe Murderers are Coming (1942) as Müller, German soldierSix P.M. (1944) as commanderGirl No. 217 (1945) as German soldier (uncredited)The Young Guard (1948) as Ignat Fomin, HilfspolizeiThe Battle of Stalingrad (1949) as Colonel PopovDream of a Cossack (1951) as spring workerIncident in the Taiga (1953)Twelfth Night (1955) as Sea CaptainThe White Poodle (1956) as yardmanA Weary Road'' (1956) as Raissa's Father

References

External links
 

1898 births
1962 deaths
Russian male film actors
Russian male silent film actors
Soviet male film actors
Soviet male silent film actors
Male actors from Moscow
20th-century Russian male actors